A Brand New Day is the tenth overall album of gospel singer Vanessa Bell Armstrong, and first for Tommy Boy Gospel, a then-recently started imprint of the Tommy Boy Records label. Though relegated to traditional gospel production on her last two releases for Jive/Verity, New Day sees Armstrong return to the urban contemporary R&B sound that marked her mainstream gospel hits such as "You Bring Out The Best In Me" and "Pressing On."

"Jesus I'll Never Forget" was released to radio as the initial single from the set. The album also provided an opportunity for Armstrong to duet with her daughter Melody on "No Failure." Melody Armstrong previously made a recorded appearance on "Anybody Here" from Deitrick Haddon's Supernatural album with resident choir Voices Of Unity.

Track listing 
 "Jesus I'll Never Forget" (3:54)
 "New Day" (2:45)
 "Make a Way" (4:00)
 "Do What He Said" (5:17)
 "You've Been Good" (3:59)
 "Somebody Prayed" (feat. Deitrick Haddon) (4:53)
 "Somebody Prayed (Remix)" (2:21)
 "He's Real" (4:11)
 "Holding On" (4:23)
 "No Failure" (Interlude) (1:11)
 "No Failure" (4:25)
 "Promise" (4:34)
 "Shall Not Be Moved" (4:33)
 "Say Goodbye" (3:53)

References

External links 
 

Vanessa Bell Armstrong albums
2001 albums